Mohammad Mizanur Rahman (born 1 June 1957) is a Bangladesh Awami League politician and a former Jatiya Sangsad member from the Khulna-2 constituency.

Early life
Rahman completed his bachelor's in commerce.

Career
Rahman was elected to Parliament from Khulna-2 on 5 January 2014 as a Bangladesh Awami League candidate.

In April 2018, the Bangladesh Anti Corruption Commission announced an investigation into his wealth. In August 2019, the commission filed a case against him for allegedly amassing wealth worth about Tk 1.5 crore beyond the known source of income.

References

1957 births
Living people
People from Khulna
Awami League politicians
10th Jatiya Sangsad members
Place of birth missing (living people)